Itaballia demophile, the cross-barred white, crossbarred white, or black-banded white, is a butterfly in the family Pieridae. It is found from the southern United States, and Mexico to Paraguay. The habitat consists of disturbed areas including forest clearings, riverbanks, roadsides, fields, cattle pastures and wasteland.

The larvae feed on the leaves of Capparis species, including Capparis indica, and Capparis frondosa.

Subspecies
The following subspecies are recognized:
I. d. calydonia (Boisduval, 1836) (Belize, Venezuela, Colombia)
I. d. centralis Joicey & Talbot, 1928 (Guatemala, Honduras)
I. d. charopus (Fruhstorfer, 1907) (Brazil: Amazonas)
I. d. demophile (Linnaeus, 1758) (Guyana)
I. d. huebneri Fruhstorfer, 1907 (Brazil)
I. d. lucania (Fruhstorfer, 1907) (Peru, Ecuador, Bolivia)
I. d. nimietes (Fruhstorfer, 1907) (Brazil: Bahia)
I. d. niphates Fruhstorfer, 1907 (Brazil: Pará)
I. d. niseias (Fruhstorfer, 1907) (Paraguay)

References

Pierini
Butterflies described in 1758
Fauna of Brazil
Pieridae of South America
Taxa named by Carl Linnaeus